The 2011–12 Serie A di calcio femminile was the 45th edition of the premier category of the Italian women's football championship. It ran from 8 October 2011 to 26 May 2012 and it was contested by fourteen teams, with FCF Como 2000, ACF Milan and ASD Riviera di Romagna joining the competition. ASD Torres Calcio won its third title in a row and a record overall sixth with a two points advantage over ASDCF Bardolino, which also qualified for the 2012-13 UEFA Champions League. Previous season's runner-up UPC Tavagnacco and Brescia followed in the table at two and four points from Champions League qualification.

ACF Venezia 1984, Milan and GS Roma CF were relegated. This season marked the introduction of a new relegation system involving the five bottom teams. The lowest team would be relegated while the other four ones would play a relegation play-off. However, in case there was a 9 points or higher difference between the second and fourth to last teams their play-off would be cancelled with the lower-ranked team being relegated. At the end of the season there was a 12 points between 10th-ranked Riviera di Romagna and 13th Milan, so the former were spared while Milan was relegated. 12th-placed Venezia defeated 11th SS Lazio CF in the other play-off, sending 5-times champion Lazio to Serie A2. However, in August Venezia renounced to its spot in the category, and it was relegated instead of Lazio.

Teams by region

League table

Relegation play-off

Results

Top scorers

References

2011-12
2011–12 domestic women's association football leagues
Women
1